Robert John Mear (born 12 January 1989) is a speedway rider from England.

Speedway career
He rode in the top tier of British Speedway riding for the Lakeside Hammers in the 2016 Elite League. He started his speedway career in England riding for the Rye House Rockets in 2004.

References 

1989 births
Living people
British speedway riders
Lakeside Hammers riders
Rye House Rockets riders